Jean-François Imbernon (born October 17, 1951 in Perpignan, France) is a retired French international rugby union player.

He played as a Lock for USA Perpignan.  He had 23 caps for France, from 1976 to 1983, without scoring. He earned his first cap with the French national team on 7 February 1976 against Ireland at Parc des Princes.

Honours 
 Selected to represent France, 1976–1983
 French rugby champion finalist  1977 with USA Perpignan
 Grand Slam : 1977, 1981
 Mediterranean Games 1979

References

External links
 Jean-Francois Imbernon International Statistics

French rugby union players
USA Perpignan players
Living people
France international rugby union players
1951 births
Mediterranean Games gold medalists for France
Rugby union locks
Sportspeople from Béziers